Susan "Suzy" Poupart (November 12, 1960 – May 20, 1990) was a Native-American woman who disappeared in May 1990. Her body was discovered six months later. The murder currently remains unsolved, although a man was taken in for questioning for her death in 2007. Additionally, another pair of men are under suspicion.

Case

Poupart, a mother of two, was last seen on May 20, 1990, with two men after leaving a party in Lac du Flambeau, Wisconsin at 4:00 AM. According to one witness, she was apparently being forced into a vehicle. Six months after she went missing, on November 22, 1990, hunters discovered her remains in the Chequamegon-Nicolet National Forest.

After testifying in court, both men who she was last seen with denied abducting her, claiming that they were going to transport the woman home, but instead dropped her off near a school. On November 22, 1990, her purse and identification were discovered underneath harvested trees. Her partial remains were subsequently found; she had apparently been sexually assaulted. Duct tape and plastic were also found, indicating that her killer or killers had attempted to hide the corpse.

Later developments
In 2007, a man was given several hearings in court after being accused of involvement in Susan Poupart's death, but the charges were later dismissed after witnesses declined to appear, although several others reportedly testified. The two men seen with Poupart after the party are considered persons of interest, along with the other man. Interviews about the case continued to be conducted between the three, but the men have given little to assist authorities.

In 2014, evidence was tested for DNA after advances with technology, but it did not unearth any new clues. Suspicion has continued to circulate through the local area about those who may be responsible for the murder, yet it is believed that most individuals have withheld their knowledge "out of fear."

A billboard along Highway 47 detailing the case was created, in hopes of receiving tips on the case, with some success. Investigators reported that they received information about the case as late as 2016, which helped the case somewhat.

See also

 List of homicides in Wisconsin
List of solved missing person cases
List of unsolved murders
Sexual victimization of Native American women
Missing and Murdered Indigenous Women

References

1990 in Wisconsin
1990s missing person cases
1990 murders in the United States
May 1990 events in the United States
May 1990 crimes
Deaths by person in Wisconsin
Formerly missing people
Incidents of violence against women
Murdered Native American people
Missing person cases in Wisconsin
Native American people from Wisconsin
Sexual assaults in the United States
Unsolved murders in the United States
Violence against women in the United States
Female murder victims
People murdered in Wisconsin
20th-century Native American women
20th-century Native Americans